The following is a timeline of the history of the city of Midland, Texas, USA.

19th century

 1884 - Midland Post Office established.
 1885 - Midland County created.
 1886 - First Baptist Church founded.
 1888 - Midland Reporter newspaper begins publication.

20th century

 1906 - City of Midland incorporated.
 1909 - County jail built.
 1910
 Midland Christian College established.
 Population: 2,192.
 1924 - Chamber of Commerce formed.
 1929
 Reporter-Telegram newspaper begins publication.
 Yucca Theatre in business.
 1932 - Midland County Historical Museum founded.
 1935 - KRLH radio begins broadcasting.
 1940 - Population: 9,352.
 1946 - U.S. military Midland Army Air Force Base closes.
 1952 - Midland County Historical Society established.
 1953 - KMID-TV (television) begins broadcasting.
 1958 - Midland County Library built.
 1960 - Population: 62,625.
 1961 - KDCD-TV (television) begins broadcasting.
 1968 - U.S. Supreme Court decides redistricting-related Avery v. Midland County lawsuit.
 1972
 Midland College active.
 Ernest Angelo becomes mayor. 
 1987 - “Baby Jessica” incident occurs
 1990 - Population: 89,443.
 1991 - American Airpower Heritage Museum relocates to Midland.
 1999 - City website online (approximate date).

21st century

 2010 - Population: 111,147.
 2014 - Jerry Morales becomes mayor.
 2019 - A spree shooting occurs in Midland and nearby Odessa, killing eight including the gunman and injuring another 25.

See also
 Midland history
 List of mayors of Midland, Texas
 Timelines of other cities in the West Texas area of Texas: Abilene, Amarillo, El Paso, Lubbock

References

Bibliography
 
 
 
 
 
 Roger M. Olien and Diana Davids Olien. Oil Booms: Social Change in Five Texas Towns. University of Nebraska Press, 1982. (About McCamey, Midland, Odessa, Snyder, Wink)

External links

 
 
 Items related to Midland, Texas, various dates (via Digital Public Library of America)

Midland
Midland, Texas